Movimiento Semilla (lit. Seed Movement) is a centre-left political party in Guatemala.

History
The Semilla Movement was registered before the Supreme Electoral Tribunal on July 14, 2017, its general secretary is César Bernardo Arévalo de León. The party began after the demonstrations that led to the resignation of President Otto Pérez Molina. The party defines itself as a political, democratic and plural movement. It has more than 22,000 members. The Semilla Movement party had rapprochement with former Attorney General Thelma Aldana to explore a possible presidential candidacy and a coalition with Encuentro por Guatemala and Libre. After investigations by Attorney General María Consuelo Porras and the UN anti-corruption commissioner Iván Velásquez Gómez requesting the removal of her parliamentary immunity from Nineth Montenegro, secretary general of Encuentro por Guatemala for possible anonymous electoral financing, the coalition left to explore. On November 21, 2018, the political organization concluded the requirements and was made official as a political party on the same day.

Semilla brings together various political groups in Guatemala.

Election results

Presidential elections

Legislative elections

References

External links

2018 establishments in Guatemala
Political parties established in 2018
Political parties in Guatemala